Dany Roussin (born January 9, 1985) is a Canadian former professional ice hockey centre who last played for Jonquière Marquis of the LNAH.

Playing career

Junior
Dany was taken in the first round (5th overall) of the QMJHL Entry Draft by the Sherbrooke Beavers. After two seasons with the Beavers, where he was stuck playing in a defensive role for Sherbrooke, Roussin was traded to the Rimouski Océanic. It was with Rimouski where Roussin would start producing offensively. He would finish the 2003 with a point per game average, scoring 38 points in 38 games. That would be enough for Roussin to get noticed by the Florida Panthers, who chose to draft Roussin in the 7th round with the 223rd pick of the NHL Entry Draft. The following year, he finished the season leading the QMJHL with 59 goals in 64 games and finishing second to teammate Sidney Crosby in points. In the 2004-05 season, Roussin would put up similar numbers. He would finish 2nd in scoring that season, beating teammate and future Edmonton Oilers 1st round pick Marc-Antoine Pouliot by two points, but finished 52 points behind Sidney Crosby. Rimouski finished 1-2-3 in scoring that season. This season improved Roussin's draft status, where the Los Angeles Kings drafted Roussin in the 2nd round of the 2005 NHL Entry Draft with the 50th pick.

Professional
On August 16, 2005, Roussin signed a three-year entry level contractwith the Los Angeles Kings. Roussin spent most of three seasons shuffling between Los Angeles' ECHL affiliate, the Reading Royals and their American Hockey League affiliate in the Manchester Monarchs.

On July 1, 2008, Roussin was not qualified a tendered offer by the Los Angeles Kings, therefore making him a free agent. Roussin did not receive an offer from any teams during the off season, so he considered going to Europe until he received a call from the Bakersfield Condors. Roussin started the season in training camp with the Milwaukee Admirals. After 5 games, where Roussin scored 3 points, Roussin left Bakersfield for France.

On November 8, 2008 Dany Roussin signed with HC Briançon of Ligue Magnus. He finished the season with 13 goals and 29 points in only 16 games.

Roussin returned to North America in 2009 and signed with Saint-Georges COOL-FM of the LNAH. In his first season with the team, Roussin scored 52 points in 42 games and was voted LNAH Rookie Of The Year by the league. In the midst of his fifth season with Saint-Georges, Roussin opted to extend his LNAH career with a trade to Jonquière Marquis on January 8, 2014. The 2014-15 season would be his last in professional hockey.

Career statistics

Regular season and playoffs

International

References

External links

1985 births
Bakersfield Condors (1998–2015) players
Canadian ice hockey left wingers
Diables Rouges de Briançon players
Florida Panthers draft picks
Ice hockey people from Quebec City
Living people
Los Angeles Kings draft picks
Manchester Monarchs (AHL) players
Reading Royals players
Rimouski Océanic players
Sherbrooke Castors players
Canadian expatriate ice hockey players in France